Muiredach (Old Irish), Muireadhach or Muireach, anglicized variously to Murdoch, Murtagh, Murray, Murdac, Mordacq and other forms, is a Goidelic name (meaning "chieftain") popular in Scotland and Ireland in the Middle Ages:

 Muiredach Bolgrach, mythological Irish king
 Muiredach Tirech, legendary high-king of Ireland
 Muiredach mac Eógain (died 489), legendary early king of Ailech
 Muiredach Muinderg (died 489), legendary king of the Ulaid
 Muiredach of Killala, reputed early Irish saint
 Muiredach Muillethan (died 702), king of Connaught
 Muiredach mac Ainbcellaig (died c. 770), king of Dál Riata
 Muiredach mac Murchado (died 760), king of Leinster
 Muiredach mac Brain (died 818) (8th-century–818), king of Leinster
 Muiredach mac Ruadrach (8th-century–829), king of Leinster
 Muiredach mac Eochada (died 839), king of the Ulaid
 Muiredach mac Brain (died 885), king of Munster
 Muiredach mac Eochocáin (died 895), king of the Ulaid
 Muireadhach Ua Carthaigh (died 1067), Chief Poet of Connacht
 Muireadhach Ua Dubhthaigh, Archbishop of Connacht
 Muireadhach Ua Flaithbheartaigh (died 1121), King of Iar Connacht
 Muiredach (ealdorman) (fl. 958–963), ealdorman
 Muireadhach I, Earl of Menteith (fl. 12th-century–13th-century), Scottish mormaer
 Muireadhach Albanach (fl. early 12th-century–13th-century), Gaelic poet and crusader
 Muireadhach II, Earl of Menteith (died c. 1230), Scottish mormaer
 Muireadhach III, Earl of Menteith (died 1332), Scottish mormaer
 Muireadhach of Inchaffray (died 1340s), Scottish abbot
 Muireadhach Sdíbhard or Muireadhach IV, Earl of Menteith (died 1425), Scottish prince
 Muredach Dynan (1938-2021), educationalist

See also
List of Irish-language given names
Murchadh

Irish-language masculine given names